Georg Moser (10 June 1923 – 9 May 1988) was a German Catholic Bishop. He was the Bishop of Rottenburg-Stuttgart.

Moser was born in Leutkirch in the Allgäu. After studying theology at the University of Tübingen from 1942 to 1947, he entered the priesthood in 1948. Moser earned his doctorate at the same university in 1962.  On 14 November 1970 he was consecrated bishop in Stuttgart, and on 25 February 1975 he became Bishop of Rottenburg (in 1978 the diocese was renamed Rottenburg-Stuttgart). Moser died in Stuttgart at the age of 65 after a long, difficult illness.

1923 births
1988 deaths
Roman Catholic bishops of Rottenburg
20th-century German Roman Catholic bishops
People from Leutkirch im Allgäu
University of Tübingen alumni
20th-century German Roman Catholic priests